UEFA U-19 Championship 2007 (Elite Round) is the second round of qualification for the final tournament of the 2007 UEFA European Under-19 Championship. Spain, Italy, and England automatically qualified for this round. The winners of each group joined hosts Austria at the final tournament.

Matches

Group 1

Group 2

Group 3

Group 4

Group 5

Group 6

Group 7

See also
2007 UEFA European Under-19 Championship
2007 UEFA European Under-19 Championship qualification

External links
 

Qualification Elite
UEFA European Under-19 Championship qualification